Christopher Robin is a character created by A. A. Milne, based on his son Christopher Robin Milne. The character appears in the author's popular books of poetry and Winnie-the-Pooh stories, and has subsequently appeared in various Disney adaptations of the Pooh stories.

In the books 
Christopher Robin appears in Milne's poems and in the two books: Winnie-the-Pooh (1926) and The House at Pooh Corner (1928). In the books he is a young boy and one of Winnie-the-Pooh's best friends. His other friends are Eeyore, Kanga and Roo, Rabbit, Piglet, Owl, and Tigger. In the second book, there are hints that Christopher Robin is growing up. In the final chapter, the inhabitants of the Hundred Acre Wood throw him a farewell party after learning he must leave them soon. It is implied that he will attend boarding school; Christopher Robin Milne, for whom the stories were originally developed, left home to attend Stowe School at age 9.

In addition to both Pooh books, the character was immortalized in other works by A. A. Milne including two books of poems: When We Were Very Young (1924) and Now We Are Six (1927). An arrangement of one of the poems, Buckingham Palace, was first recorded by Ann Stephens in July 1941. Petula Clark released a recording of it in 1953 to coincide with the coronation of Queen Elizabeth II, and despite neither making the charts, both versions were popular on BBC radio's Children's Favourites programme.

According to David Benedictus's 2009 sequel Return to the Hundred Acre Wood, Christopher Robin was at school, but during the summer break he returns to the forest for a visit with a lot of knowledge to share. Though slightly older, he is still the same person as before and is happy to share more good times with his friends all summer. At the end of the summer, he has to leave again for another school year, but the animals know they will see him again.

Christopher Robin is cheerful, compassionate, adventurous, fun-loving, imaginative, and helpful. Despite being a child, he is much wiser and more mature than many of the other characters, and is someone Pooh and the others look up to. In the book illustrations, his house appears as a hollow tree with a door at the top of the forest.

Christopher Robin Milne 
Christopher Robin was based on the author A. A. Milne's son, Christopher Robin Milne, who later in life became disappointed about the use of his name. Christopher Milne wrote in one of a series of autobiographical works: "It seemed to me almost that my father had got where he was by climbing on my infant shoulders, that he had filched from me my good name and left me nothing but empty fame," One of the poems, "Vespers" – which describes young Christopher Robin saying his evening prayers – was said by Christopher Milne as "the one work that has brought me over the years more toe-curling, fist-clenching, lip-biting embarrassment than any other."

Disney adaptations 

Since 1966, Disney has released numerous features starring Winnie-the-Pooh and related characters. Christopher Robin appears in all of the Disney adaptations except for Kingdom Hearts, Welcome to Pooh Corner, Boo to You Too! Winnie the Pooh, Springtime with Roo, and Pooh's Heffalump Halloween Movie. But in most of the cartoons, he is only a supporting character, sometimes only appearing in a few scenes or episodes; in Pooh's Heffalump Movie, he only appears during the credits. His personality is virtually the same as in the books, but he attends day school instead of boarding school.

Christopher Robin's bedroom, but not Christopher Robin himself, appears in live-action opening sequences. In the world within his storybooks, his house appears just as it does in E. H. Shepard's illustrations.

An English boy living in the Ashdown Forest, Christopher Robin has brown hair. He wears a yellow polo shirt with white collar and trim on his short sleeves, blue shorts, white socks and black Mary Jane shoes (or sometimes red sneakers). On several appropriate occasions, he plays a snare drum.

The New Adventures of Winnie the Pooh re-imagines him as an American boy living in the suburban house 100 Acre Road whose backyard connects directly to the Hundred Acre Wood. His mother also appears in the series and Robin is apparently their surname in that continuity.

Some of these elements were reused for The Book of Pooh, but the animals are once again characters in Christopher Robin's storybook. His hollow tree house does not appear from both series.

Christopher Robin has appeared on House of Mouse with his friends, but he is the only main Winnie-the-Pooh character that does not appear in the Kingdom Hearts video game series; in this continuity, the Winnie-the-Pooh book belongs to Merlin and Christopher Robin's role is played out mostly by Sora. He only appears in two episodes of My Friends Tigger and Pooh but in the whole series, he is absent and is replaced by his younger friend Darby, a feisty red-headed girl who is the main protagonist and hosts the series.

His appearance was updated for the 2011 film.

In the Doc McStuffins crossover special "Into the Hundred Acre Wood!", Christopher Robin visits Doc's toy hospital searching for Pooh, who has been admitted as a patient. Christopher Robin and Doc bond through their shared ability to talk to toys. The character is voiced by Oliver Bell. 

Ewan McGregor played a grown-up version of the character in the 2018 Disney live-action film Christopher Robin, while Orton O'Brien portrays the character as a child. In this film adaptation, the now adult Christopher is director of efficiency at a luggage company, and Pooh ultimately helps him to devise a plan to significantly decrease the company's expenditures.

Portrayals 
Of the nine main characters, Christopher Robin has the most voice actors. He has been voiced by the following:
 Bruce Reitherman: Winnie the Pooh and the Honey Tree
 Jon Walmsley: Winnie the Pooh and the Blustery Day, The Many Adventures of Winnie the Pooh (also re-recorded Christopher's lines for Honey Tree)
 Timothy Turner: Winnie the Pooh and Tigger Too
 Kim Christianson: Winnie the Pooh and a Day for Eeyore
 Tim Hoskins: The New Adventures of Winnie the Pooh
 Edan Gross: Winnie the Pooh and Christmas Too
 Brady Bluhm: Pooh's Grand Adventure: The Search for Christopher Robin, A Winnie the Pooh Thanksgiving, A Valentine for You and Winnie the Pooh: Seasons of Giving
 Frankie J. Galasso: Pooh's Grand Adventure: The Search for Christopher Robin (singing voice)
 Tom Attenborough: The Tigger Movie
 Tom Wheatley: Piglet's Big Movie
 Kath Soucie: Piglet's Big Movie (singing voice)
 William Green: A Very Merry Pooh Year
 Paul Tiesler: The Book of Pooh
 Struan Erlenborn: My Friends Tigger and Pooh
 Jack Boulter: Winnie-the-Pooh
 Oliver Bell: Doc McStuffins

Reitherman, Hoskins, Gross and Tiesler are the only actors to use an American accent for the character. All others use received pronunciation.

References 

Literary characters introduced in 1926
Child characters in animated films
Child characters in television
Child characters in literature
Male characters in animation
Male characters in television
Male characters in literature
Fictional children
Fictional English people
Winnie-the-Pooh characters
Animation based on real people
Characters in poems
Fictional British Army personnel
Fictional World War II veterans
Fictional characters based on real people